The Go Find is a Belgian group led by vocalist and multi-instrumentalist Dieter Sermeus (b. 1975), previously of Orange Black. Initially an electronica side-project it soon developed into a working band, which has released four albums to date.<ref>"Morr Music News Feature" Brand New Love' by The Go Find now pre-released!' press release Morr Music, accessed February 10, 2014</ref>

Discography
 Albums 

 Miami, 2004
 Stars on the Wall, 2007
 Everybody Knows It's Gonna Happen Only Not Tonight, 2010
 Brand New Love'', 2014

External links 
 The Go Find website
 Morr Music's The Go Find Page

Reviews 
 Splendid Magazine reviews The Go Find: Miami

References

Belgian electronic music groups
Morr Music artists